The IIHF Asia and Oceania Championship (formally the IIHF Challenge Cup of Asia) are a series of international ice hockey tournaments in the continent of Asia. The purpose of the tournament is to provide competitive opportunities for Asian and Oceania teams that are either in the lower divisions of the IIHF World Championships or did not compete in any IIHF World Championships. The first edition was held in Hong Kong from 24 to 26 April 2008, with the second edition held a year later in the United Arab Emirates. The third edition took place from 29 March to 4 April 2010 in the Republic of China.

The first women's tournament took place in Shanghai, China from 10 to 14 April 2010, and the first University Challenge Cup of Asia took place in Goyang-Si, Seoul, South Korea from 12 to 14 May 2010. Junior (under-20) and under-18 editions were introduced in 2012. On 31 January 2020, the women's and men's under-20 tournaments were cancelled, except the men's tournament, due to the COVID-19 pandemic. The competition was renamed to the IIHF Asia and Oceania Championship starting with the 2022 season.

Results

Men's

Men's Division I

Women's

Women's Division I

University/Men's U20

Men's U20 Division I

Men's U18

Medal table

Men's
Countries in bold currently compete in the lower divisions of the IIHF World Championships.

Women's
Countries in bold currently compete in the IIHF World Women's Championships.

Men's U20

See also
 IIHF Asian Oceanic U18 Championships

References

External links
 IIHF Challenge Cup of Asia at eurohockey.com

International Ice Hockey Federation tournaments
 
Recurring sporting events established in 2008
Ice hockey tournaments in Asia
Asian championships